Curtiss Northwest Airport was a small airfield at the intersection of Snelling and Larpenteur Avenues in present-day Falcon Heights. One of Minnesota's first centers of aviation, it opened in 1919 and closed in 1930. Curtiss Field, a city park named for the airport, still occupies a portion of the site, while a nearby restaurant displays several photos of the old landing strip. In 2008 St. Paul author Roger Bergerson published a comprehensive history of Curtiss Northwest Airport, which is available at online retailers, local bookstores and public libraries.

References

External links
The airport's first owner: William A. Kidder 
Abandoned & Little-Known Airfields:Minnesota
Photos
Como Park Grill
Curtiss Field city park
Minnesota Historical Society

Airports established in 1919
Airports in Minnesota
Defunct airports in Minnesota    
1919 establishments in Minnesota
1930 disestablishments in Minnesota